Dumești is a commune in Iași County, Western Moldavia, Romania. It is composed of five villages: Banu, Chilișoaia, Dumești, Hoisești and Păușești.

References

Communes in Iași County
Localities in Western Moldavia